The 2011 Olivier Awards were held on 13 March 2011 at the Theatre Royal, Drury Lane, London.  The 2011 awards were intended to re-launch the Oliviers as a major awards event, and so they were sponsored by MasterCard, with live coverage by the BBC.

The Theatre show was presented by Michael Ball and Imelda Staunton, with BBC Radio 2 coverage from Paul Gambaccini.

Special guests included Stephen Sondheim, Angela Lansbury, Cameron Mackintosh, Barry Manilow as well as performances by Ramin Karimloo, Alfie Boe, Kerry Ellis, Adrian Lester as well as the London casts of Legally Blonde and Into the Woods to name a few.

The show was accompanied by the BBC Concert Orchestra, conducted by David Charles Abell, and the finale was accompanied by a choir from the CDS (Conference Drama Schools).

Winners and nominees 
The nominations were announced on 7 February 2011 in 25 categories.

Productions with multiple nominations and awards
The following 21 productions, including one ballet and one opera, received multiple nominations:

 7: Love Never Dies
 6: After the Dance
 5: King Lear, Legally Blonde
 4: Clybourne Park, End of the Rainbow
 3: Fela, Love Story, Passion, Sweet Charity, The White Guard
 2: Adriana Lecouvreur, All My Sons, Babel (Words), Ghost Stories, Hamlet, Into the Woods, Sucker Punch, The Little Dog Laughed, The Railway Children, Tribes

The following four productions, including one ballet, received multiple awards:

 4: After the Dance
 3: Legally Blonde, The White Guard
 2: Babel (Words)

See also
 65th Tony Awards

References

External links
 Previous Olivier Winners – 2011

Laurence Olivier Awards ceremonies
Laurence Olivier
Laurence Olivier Awards
Laurence Olivier Awards
Laurence Olivier Awards